The De Tomaso 505/38 is a Formula One racing car model, designed by Gian Paolo Dallara for Italian car-manufacturer De Tomaso and raced during the 1970 Formula One season by Frank Williams Racing Cars.

The car was uncompetitive on debut, failing to finish or be classified the first four races of the year. Disaster struck at the following Dutch Grand Prix. Driver Piers Courage was killed in an accident that saw his De Tomaso 505 flip and catch fire. The loss deeply upset Williams; the distance the team principal now places between himself and his drivers has been attributed to this event.

The car never managed to be classified in a World Championship race, finishing only twice, in Monaco and Canada, twelve and eleven laps behind the winner respectively.

Complete Formula One World Championship results 
(key)

Non-Championship Formula One results
(key) (Races in bold indicate pole position)
(Races in italics indicate fastest lap)

References

De Tomaso vehicles